PBD may refer to:

 .pbd, a computer file name extension for PowerBuilder
 Butyl PBD. a fluorescent organic compound
 Conservative Democratic Party of Switzerland
 Pacific Bell Directory
 Pacific black duck, a dabbling duck
 Pale Blue Dot, a photograph of Earth made by Voyager 1, and
 Pale Blue Dot (book), a 1994 book by Carl Sagan
 Pale Blue Dot (album), a 2008 album by Benn Jordan
 Pediatric bipolar disorder, that is, bipolar disorder in children
 Peroxisome biogenesis disorders, a group of rare and severe congenital disorders
 Peterbald, a cat bred
 Porbandar Airport (IATA: PBD), Gujarat, India
 Pravasi Bharatiya Divas, a celebratory day in India
 Programming by demonstration (PbD), a technique to create automated tasks for computers and robots without using a programming language
 Pyrrolobenzodiazepine, a medical compound